Presnakov Island is the 390 m long in southeast-northwest direction and 100 m wide rocky island lying off the west coast of Low Island in the South Shetland Islands, Antarctica.

The island is “named after Captain Ivan Presnakov (1932–2003), commander of the ocean fishing trawler Aurelia of the Bulgarian company Ocean Fisheries – Burgas during its fishing trip to Antarctic waters off South Georgia and the South Orkney Islands from September 1977 to April 1978.  The Bulgarian fishermen, along with those of the Soviet Union, Poland and East Germany are the pioneers of modern Antarctic fishing industry.”

Location
British mapping in 2009.

Maps
 South Shetland Islands: Smith and Low Islands. Scale 1:150000 topographic map No. 13677. British Antarctic Survey, 2009.
 Antarctic Digital Database (ADD). Scale 1:250000 topographic map of Antarctica. Scientific Committee on Antarctic Research (SCAR). Since 1993, regularly upgraded and updated.

Notes

References
 Presnakov Island. SCAR Composite Gazetteer of Antarctica.
 Bulgarian Antarctic Gazetteer. Antarctic Place-names Commission. (details in Bulgarian, basic data in English)

External links
 Presnakov Island. Copernix satellite image

Islands of the South Shetland Islands
Ocean Fisheries – Burgas Co
Bulgaria and the Antarctic